McEnany is a surname of Irish origin (Irish Mac Conaonaigh, "son of hound of fair", also corrupted to Mac an Éanaigh, "son of the birds")

Notable people with the surname include:

 Abby McEnany (born 1968), American comedian
 Kayleigh McEnany (born 1988), American political commentator and author

See also
McEnaney
McEneny

Surnames of Irish origin
Anglicised Irish-language surnames